Nafissath Radji (born 2 August 2002 in Porto-Novo) is a Beninese swimmer.

She competed in the girls' 50 metre backstroke event at the 2018 Summer Youth Olympics held in Buenos Aires, Argentina. She did not qualify to compete in the semi-finals.

In 2019, she represented Benin at the World Aquatics Championships held in Gwangju, South Korea. She competed in the women's 50 metre freestyle event. She did not advance to compete in the semi-finals. She also competed in the women's 50 metre backstroke event. In that same year, she also represented Benin at the 2019 African Games held in Rabat, Morocco.

In 2021, she competed in the women's 50 metre freestyle event at the 2020 Summer Olympics held in Tokyo, Japan. Her time of 29.99 seconds in her heat did not qualify for the semifinals.

She represented Benin at the 2022 World Aquatics Championships held in Budapest, Hungary. She competed in the women's 50 metre freestyle and women's 100 metre freestyle events.

References 

Living people
2002 births
Place of birth missing (living people)
Beninese female swimmers
Beninese female freestyle swimmers
Female backstroke swimmers
Swimmers at the 2018 Summer Youth Olympics
Swimmers at the 2019 African Games
African Games competitors for Benin
Olympic swimmers of Benin
Swimmers at the 2020 Summer Olympics
21st-century Beninese women